Robert Alexander Bryden (7 July 1841 – 14 April 1906) was a Scottish architect, prominent in the second half of the 19th century. He was mainly active in the west of Scotland, where he designed schools, churches and municipal buildings.

Early life
Bryden was born in Glasgow, Scotland, on 7 July 1841, the son of Robert Bryden and Margaret Ramage.

He was educated at Arthur's Academy in Dunoon, Argyll, and Kirkcaldy Grammar School.

Career
In the 1860s, he was an apprentice at Glasgow-based practice Clarke & Bell, of whom he became a partner around 1875.  He was elected a Fellow of the Royal Institute of British Architects in 1878.

Selected works
Selected works include:

Dunoon Burgh Hall (1873)
St Cuthbert's Church, Dunoon (1874; now demolished)
St John's Church, Dunoon (1876)
Dunoon Infants' School (1880)
Broughton Parish Church (rebuilding; 1886)
Seafield Children's Hospital (rebuilding; 1888)
Lanarkshire Regimental Drill Hall, Glasgow (1894)
Dunoon Pier and offices (rebuilding; 1896)
Sir Charles Cameron Memorial Fountain, Glasgow (1896) – the clocktower dome of the fountain

Personal life
Bryden married Elizabeth Robertson, daughter of Alexander Robertson. They had at least one child, a son named Andrew Francis Stewart Bryden (21 October 1876 – 23 February 1917), who also became a noted architect and a Fellow of RIBA. For the final few years of Bryden Sr.'s life, the two worked as partners.

Death
Bryden died in Glasgow on 14 April 1906, aged 64. He is interred in Dunoon Cemetery, half a mile to the north of Dunoon Burgh Hall, one of his designs. He is believed to be the subject of the building's stained-glass window.

References
Specific

General
Acknowledgment of Bryden as the architect of the former Pearl Association Building (now the Radisson Glasgow)
Quarriers Homes CAA Draft Report - Inverclyde Council

20th-century Scottish architects
19th-century Scottish architects
Fellows of the Royal Institute of British Architects
1841 births
1906 deaths
Architects from Glasgow